The United States U-19 women's national soccer team is a youth soccer team operated under the auspices of U.S. Soccer. Its primary role is the development of players in preparation for the senior women's national team, as well as bridging the development between the two major youth competition levels of the U-17 and the U-20.

History
The United States U-19 became active as the primary youth-level national team in 2001 when the United States Soccer Federation decided to change the age limit from the U-18 to U-19.  The move was in preparation for FIFA's introduction of the first ever FIFA U-19 Women's World Championship (which has since changed to U-20). The new U-19 squad won the inaugural 2002 FIFA U-19 Women's World Championship in Canada, where they beat the hosts on a golden goal by captain and future United States women's national team mainstay Lindsay Tarpley. Five other members of that same team would join Tarpley as teammates on the senior international team: Rachel Buehler, Lori Chalupny, Heather O'Reilly, Leslie Osborne and Angie Woznuk.  Other notable 2002 team members were Kelly Wilson, the all-time leading goal scorer in the history of the U-20 team, as well as two-time Hermann Trophy winner Kerri Hanks, who would go on to become one of the most decorated players in women's collegiate soccer.

In 2004, the U-19 team placed third at the 2004 FIFA U-19 Women's World Championship in Thailand, after having been defeated by Germany in the semifinals. The tournament marked the world championship debut of future senior national team members Yael Averbuch, Stephanie Lopez, Amy Rodriguez and Megan Rapinoe. 2004 also saw the first loss to a similar-aged team in the history of the program when the squad lost to Japan.

The U-19 team became dormant in 2005 when U.S. Soccer raised the age of the squad from U-19 to U-20. The move was, again, in response to FIFA's altering of the competition age from U-19 to U-20. The team subsequently had only periodic competitions until 2019, when the Federation (under general manager Kate Markgraf) reinstated all youth-level teams in their own right.

Competitive record

FIFA U-19 Women's World Cup

CONCACAF Women's U-19 Championship tournament record

Players

Current squad
The following 20 players were named to the squad for the tournament on February 28–March 9, 2020, in La Manga, Spain.

Recent call-ups
The following players were named to a squad in the last 12 months.

Coaches
  Tracey Leone (2001–2004)
  Mark Krikorian (2004)
  Jitka Klimková (2015–2017)
  Twila Kaufman (2020–)

References

Youth soccer in the United States
Women's national under-19 association football teams
North American national under-19 association football teams
Soc
U19
U19